The 2012 FAM Youth Championship, includes the youth teams of all the Dhivehi League teams and 2 other teams from any part of the Maldives who want to participate (Mahibadhoo Sports Club and Kelaa Naalhi Sports). The age group of this tournament is Under-21.

Participated Teams

Group A
 Maziya Sports & Recreation Club
 Victory Sports Club
 VB Addu Football Club
 Mahibadhoo Sports Club
 Vyansa

Group B
 New Radiant Sports Club
 Kelaa Naalhi Sports
 Club Eagles
 Club All Youth Linkage
 Club Valencia

Group stage
Times are Islamabad, Karachi (UTC+5).

Group A

Group B

Semi final
1st Semi winners will be the first team to play the final. 2nd Semi winners will have to play in the 3rd Semi with the 1st Semi losers. The winner of 3rd Semi will be the second team to play in the final.

Final

Goal scorers
6 goals
 (Maziya S&RC) Mohamed Thasmeen

5 goals
 (Club Valencia) Mohamed Farish Ibrahim

4 goals
 (Maziya S&RC) Guraish Abdul Razzaq
 (Victory SC) Ahmed Sujau
 (Victory SC) Ahmed Rasheed
 (Club Eagles) Ahmed Imaaz

3 goals
 (Mahibadhoo) Abdul Basith
 (Club AYL) Moosa Yamin
 (Victory SC) Mohamed Jilwaz Zahir

2 goals
 (Vyansa) Abdulla Shaffan
 (Maziya S&RC) Hassan Shifaz
 (Victory SC) Affan Hamza
 (Club Eagles) Ansar Ibrahim
 (Club Eagles) Hussain Athif
 (Club Eagles) Ahmed Husham
 (Kelaa Naalhi) Ahmed Inad

1 goal

 (Victory SC) Anas Mohamed
 (Victory SC) Hassan Ibrahim
 (Victory SC) Ismail Juhain Zahir
 (Victory SC) Rilwan Waheed
 (Victory SC) Ahmed Ziaan
 (Maziya S&RC) Amdhan Ali
 (Mahibadhoo) Shuaid Saeed
 (Mahibadhoo) Mohamed Sharih
 (Mahibadhoo) Ibrahim Shathir
 (Mahibadhoo) Ibrahim Nooradhdheen
 (Mahibadhoo) Gasim Samaam
 (Mahibadhoo) Hussain Riza
 (Vyansa) Ibrahim Suhail

 (Vyansa) Ahmed Haleem
 (Vyansa) Ahmed Thariq
 (Kelaa Naalhi) Haris Rasheed
 (Kelaa Naalhi) Hussain Nihaan
 (New Radiant SC) Mohamed Shabeen Adam
 (New Radiant SC) Safwan Rameez
 (Club AYL) Ayaaz Ahmed
 (Club AYL) Migdhadh Saeed
 (Club Eagles) Abdulla Shafeeu Hashim
 (Club Eagles) Mahroos Mujuthaba
 (Club Eagles) Mohamed Zaidh
 (Club Valencia) Huzaam Hameed
 (Club Valencia) Mohamed Irufaan

1 own goal
 (Mahibadhoo) Adam Naufal against Vyansa
 (Vyansa) Hussain Naashid against Victory SC
 (Kelaa Naalhi) Hussain Sajid  against Club Eagles

Awards

Best 4 players
 Ahmed Imaaz (Club Eagles)
 Mohamed Thasmeen (Maziya S&RC)
 Hassan Shifaz (Maziya S&RC)
 Mohamed Faseel (Victory SC)

Top goal scorer
 Mohamed Thasmeen (Maziya S&RC)

Best coach
 Mohamed Nazeeh (Victory SC)

Fair play team
 Victory SC

References

External links
 2012 FAM Youth Championship's Official Website at Facebook
 Youth C' Ship: Future looks bright says Nazeeh at MaldiveSoccer
 Youth C' Ship: Never lost hope says Affan

FAM Youth Championship
4